Center for Studies and Social Action (CEAS) was founded by the Society of Jesus in 1967 and works to diminish poverty and social exclusion] in the Northeast Region, Brazil. It lends its assistance to urban and rural groups and produces a journal.

References  

Jesuit development centres
Organizations established in 1967
Social welfare charities based in Brazil